Mindless may refer to:

 Mindless (film) (Meeletu), a 2006 Estonian comedy film or the play on which it's based
 Mindless, an unreleased American indie horror film with executive producer Michael Biehn
 Mindless Records, a personal record label owned by Keith Richards
"Mindless", a 1992 song from Cool World (soundtrack)
"Mindless", a 2003 song from Entheogenic album Spontaneous Illumination  
"Mindless", a 2010 song from Daysend's album Within the Eye of Chaos

See also